Tenaturris decora is a species of sea snail, a marine gastropod mollusk in the family Mangeliidae.

Description

Distribution
This species occurs in the Caribbean Sea off Colombia and the Lesser Antilles; also off Northern Brazil.

References

External links
   Smith, E.A. (1882) Diagnoses of new species of Pleurotomidae in the British Museum. Annals and Magazine of Natural History, series 5, 10, 206–218  
 
 

decora
Gastropods described in 1882